Ma famille (French: My Family) is an Ivorian television series. The series "became one of the greatest success stories in the history of Ivorian television production, reaching most Francophone African countries."

Cast

Amélie Wabehi
Akissi Delta
Clémentine Papouet
Michel Gohou
Nastou Traoré
Oupoh Dahier
Josiane Yapo
Méaka Hortense
Patricia Ballet (Patty)
Bassande Innocent
Decothey
Kramo Kouadio Paul
Amoin Koffi
Gueï Thérèse (Gbazé)
Marie-Laure (Rogine Zouzou)
Maï La Bombe
Angéline Nadié
Thérèse Taba
Kouamé Eleonore
Digbeu Cravatte
Ange Keffa
Michel Bohiri
Marie-Louise Asseu
Mican Koné
Dohoun Kevin

References

Ivorian television series
2002 establishments in Ivory Coast
2002 Ivorian television series debuts
2007 Ivorian television series endings
2000s Ivorian television series
Radiodiffusion Television Ivoirienne original programming